St. Joseph's Minor Basilica Church is a Roman Catholic Church building in Elmina, in the Central Region of Ghana.  Established in 1880, it was the first Roman Catholic church to have been established in Ghana. It was founded by [Fathers Maru] and [Marat], the first Dutch Catholic priests to minister to the Ghanaians. Their busts are fixed on either side of the front door.

See also

 Architecture of Africa
 Roman Catholicism in Ghana
 List of Roman Catholic basilicas

References

External links
 .

19th-century establishments in Gold Coast (British colony)
Basilica churches in Ghana
Elmina
Roman Catholic churches completed in 1880
19th-century Roman Catholic church buildings